Venray or Venraij is a municipality and a city in Limburg, the Netherlands.

About 30,000 of those inhabitants live in the city of Venray; the other 13,000 live in one of the 13 surrounding towns.

Topography 

 Dutch topographic map of Venray (town), Dec. 2013

Populated places

Mental Hospitals 
In 1905, the Sint Servatius mental hospital for men was built by the Brothers of Charity. The first patients arrived in 1907. In 1906, the Sint Anna mental hospital for women was built by the Sisters of Charity of Jesus and Mary. The first patients arrived in 1909. In 1969, management of the mental hospitals was transferred to two separate foundations. Both mental hospitals have had a big impact on Venray from cultural, religious and employment perspectives that lasts up to today. Nowadays, both mental hospitals are managed by GGZ Noord- en Midden-Limburg.

Venray also hosts one of 12 mental hospitals in the Netherlands, De Rooyse Wissel, that house people assigned to mental treatment as a measure by the courts.

St. Peter in Chains Church 
The St. Peter ad Vincula church in Venray hosts one of the largest late medieval collections of wooden sculptures that survived the iconoclasm of the protestant reformation in the Netherlands. The church itself was originally built in the 15th century in the gothic style. It was rebuilt after extensive damage following the World War II Battle of Overloon.

World War II 

Towards the end of World War II there were a lot of battles in and around Venray, damaging large parts of the center of Venray. One of the more famous battles around Venray is the Battle of Overloon. One of the biggest tank battles between the Germans and Allies was fought in October 1944 in Overloon, resulting in hundreds of casualties on both sides. Venray was not liberated until 1945. Venray is also famous for its German War Cemetery, as it is the only German war cemetery in the Netherlands. 31,598 German soldiers are buried at this cemetery.

Economy 
Inalfa: Venray hosts the head-office and a manufacturing plant of Inalfa, a supplier of car roofs to the automotive industry.
Flextronics: Venray hosts manufacturing units and logistics centers for Flextronics
Herbalife: Venray hosts a European logistics center for Herbalife.
ModusLink: Venray hosts a major supply chain location for ModusLink
OTTO Work Force: Venray hosts the head-office for OTTO Work Force, a temp agency that predominantly provides Polish expatriate workers.
Xerox: Venray hosts a manufacturing plant and European logistics center for Rank Xerox, later Xerox. Nowadays, the European logistics center and a Toner and Photoconductor plant remain. In the 1990s Xerox outsourced manufacturing of copier and printers to Flextronics.
Royal Netherlands Air Force: Venray houses De Peel Air Base.

In recent decades Venray has made a transition from a manufacturing base to a third-party logistics base. As a consequence many warehouses have been built on industrial estates in recent years.

Small and medium enterprises and mental healthcare also continue to play an important role in the local economy. Venray also provides logistics through its Meuse river harbor in Wanssum and A73 motorway.

Nature 
The western section of Venray, the villages Vredepeel and Ysselsteyn, was reclaimed from the Peel peat bogs in the early 20th century. Parts of the peat bogs remain and have been transferred to a national park. The western section of Venray is also straddled by part of the Peel-Raam Line, defensive works consisting of a canal and bunkers dating to the World War II period.

Venray, near Geijsteren, also has a forest and sand dune area, that is one of the few locations in the Netherlands that is home to common juniper.

Notable residents 

 Godfrey Henschen (1601–1681) a Belgian Jesuit hagiographer, one of the first Bollandists
 Harry Peeters (1931-2012), a historian, psychologist and academic
 Theo van Els (1936–2015) a professor of applied linguistics
 Gerard Verschuuren (born 1946), a human geneticist and philosopher
 Louis Sévèke (1964–2005) a Dutch radical left activist, journalist, writer and murder victim 
 Michelle Courtens (born 1981), a singer
 Koen Heldens (born 1986), mixing engineer

Sport 
 Peter Winnen (born 1957), a cyclist, winner of Alpe d'Huez
 Edward Linskens (born 1968), a football player
 Leopold van Asten (born 1976) a Dutch show jumping equestrian, participated at the 2004 Summer Olympics
 Mark Veens (born 1978), a freestyle swimmer
 Mike Teunissen (born 1992) a Dutch racing cyclist
 Pauliena Rooijakkers (born 1993) a road cyclist

See also 
Battle of Venray
Venray sheep companies

References

External links

 
Populated places in Limburg (Netherlands)
Municipalities of Limburg (Netherlands)